Notiphila caudata is a species of fly in the family Ephydridae. It is found in the  Palearctic.
Male arista with 8-10 hairs. Abdomen: tergite IV with 8-16 marginal macrochaetes : Female tegument shining black; chaetotaxy normal. Wing: transverse MA2c slightly angled; 2 subequal costal spines. Length 4-4,25 mm. Found on pond margins and in other humid situations, from May to September.

Distribution
Canada, United States, Europe.

References

External links
Images representing Ephydridae at BOLD

Ephydridae
Insects described in 1813
Taxa named by Carl Fredrik Fallén
Diptera of Europe
Diptera of North America